William Henry "Pat" Hardgrove (May 10, 1895 – January 26, 1973) was a pinch hitter in Major League Baseball. He played for the Chicago White Sox in 1918. He played third base in the minor leagues from 1912-24.

References

External links

1895 births
1973 deaths
Chicago White Sox players
Baseball players from Kansas
Bloomington Bloomers players
Dubuque Dubs players
Charles City Tractorites players
Cedar Rapids Rabbits players
Rockford Rox players
Fort Worth Panthers players
Evansville Evas players
Bridgeport Bears (baseball) players
People from Douglas County, Kansas